Nanomantini is a tribe of Asian mantises in the new (2019) family Nanomantidae. There are about 6 genera and 10 described species in Nanomantini.

Genera
These genera belong to the tribe Nanomantini:
 Nanomantis Saussure, 1871
 Parananomantis Mukherjee, 1995 (monotypic)
 Sceptuchus Hebard, 1920

References

Further reading

 
 
 

Nanomantidae
Mantodea tribes